Großer Sternberger See is a lake in Mecklenburg-Vorpommern, Germany. It has a surface area is 2.5 km² and is at an elevation of 8.6 m. It is located just east of the city of Sternberg.

See also
Sternberg Lake District Nature Park

External links 

 

Lakes of Mecklenburg-Western Pomerania